Salles-sur-Mer is a commune in the Charente-Maritime department, region of Nouvelle-Aquitaine (formerly Poitou-Charentes), southwestern France.

Population

See also
Communes of the Charente-Maritime department

References

Communes of Charente-Maritime
Charente-Maritime communes articles needing translation from French Wikipedia